Jawaharnagar railway station is a railway station located near Sikaribari of Dhalai district in Tripura.

Jurisdiction
It belongs to the Lumding railway division of the Northeast Frontier Railway Zone of Dhalai district in Tripura. The station code is JWNR.

Line

International access

A proposal has been mooted to create a  railway line to Myanmar via Mizoram to join the Trans-Asian Railway network in 2013. Also a new proposal of railway line to Dhaka has cropped up in 2015, connecting Myanmar via Sairang in Mizoram. The proposed rail line once established will further connect to Thailand, Singapore and Malaysia.

References

External links

Railway stations in Dhalai district
Lumding railway division